Shibue (written: 渋江) is a Japanese surname. Notable people with the surname include:

, Japanese physician
, Japanese model and actor

Japanese-language surnames